The Autopista Havana–Mariel, also known as Carretera Panamericana, is a Cuban motorway linking Havana to Mariel. Even though it is a motorway (autopista), it is part of the national highway Circuito Norte (CN).

Route
The highway is a dual carriageway with 4 lanes and has some at-grade intersections with rural roads. Differently from other Cuban motorways in Cuban mainland, the Panamericana is the only one not directly linked to the network.

The autopista starts in Santa Fe, a suburban ward of western Havana, and continues through Artemisa Province, by the Atlantic Coastline. It crosses the municipal territories of Bauta, Caimito, and ends north of Mariel, near La Boca, in front of Mariel Bay.

The road that continues towards south, the "Circuito Norte", reaches Mariel after  and, after , the A4 exit "Mariel-Nodarse", on the "ZEDM beltway" (Port of Mariel-Guanajay). This beltway, together with the A4 main route Guanajay-Havana, represents an alternative motorway road to the Panamericana, between Mariel and the Cuban capital.

See also

Infrastructure of Cuba
Roads in Cuba
Transport in Cuba

References

External links

Autopista Havana Mariel
Transport in Havana
Artemisa Province